Moimacco is small a town in the province of Udine, situated a few kilometres west of Cividale del Friuli,  above sea level, in the north-east corner of Italy.

History
Located at the intersection of important trade routes, legend says that Moimacco was funded by an officer of the Roman army named Mommeius (or Mumius). Since its origins the economy of the village was tied to the neighboring center of Cividale.

Economy
Today, Moimacco's  industrial district provides jobs for workers commuting from close by cities. A few small farms are present as well.

Main sights
Places of interest are the churches of S. Maria Assunta, San Giovanni and San Donato, the noble villas De Claricini and De Puppi, with splendid gardens and art collections.

Food
Frico is a cheese and potatoes, or sometimes only cheese, pan fried pie. Other local products include salami and the cheese Montasio.

References

Cities and towns in Friuli-Venezia Giulia